Eisenhower Parkway, also known as County Route 609 (CR 609), is a highway in Essex County, New Jersey, located in the municipalities of Roseland and Livingston.  Eisenhower Parkway dead ends at South Orange Avenue (County Route 510) in Livingston near the Livingston Mall and just north of Interstate 280 in Roseland. The Eisenhower Parkway was planned to continue further north to Route 46 in Fairfield and further south to Route 24 in Chatham, with the latter extension to be called Triborough Road. An abandoned cloverleaf interchange exists where Triborough Road was to intersect Route 24.  Several proposals have been generated to complete the northern half into West Caldwell.

Route description
The Eisenhower Parkway begins at an intersection with CR 510 in Livingston, Essex County, heading north as a four-lane divided highway. The road passes the Livingston Mall before becoming undivided and passing to the east of the Commonwealth Water Company Reservoir Number Three. Upon turning northeast, the roadway becomes divided again as it crosses CR 607 and passes through forests. The Eisenhower Parkway intersects Route 10 at the modified Livingston Circle, at which point the road passes businesses as CR 661 branches to the east of the road. The highway heads north-northeast through more forested areas with occasional commercial development, meeting CR 661 again prior to crossing into Roseland. Here, the road crosses the Morristown and Erie Railway's Whippany Line and passes businesses, crossing CR 611 prior to coming to a cloverleaf interchange with I-280. At this interchange, the CR 609 designation ends and the Eisenhower Parkway continues northeast to a dead end a short distance later.

History

The original plan of the Parkway was to extend to Bloomfield Avenue in West Caldwell on the northern end and to Route 124 in Chatham on the southern end.  There is a complete cloverleaf interchange at where the parkway would have met Route 24, which would have been Interchange 5 on 24 (and there were once blank signs erected on 24 West). The interchange was left abandoned since it does not connect to a road, and many plants have grown over the abandoned pavement. The bridge over Route 24, which would have been part of Eisenhower Parkway, as well as what would've been the entrance and exit ramps, cannot be accessed by vehicle but are easy to reach by foot or bike. Hikers and bikers must go north along the power lines from the intersection of Brooklake Road and Delbarton Drive until they reach the fence along Route 24, then follow the fence east for about half a mile.  NJDOT gave the abandoned overpass a different street name, Triborough Road, suggesting that the southern extension of the Eisenhower Parkway would use that name instead. To this day, there is still a sign that reads "Triborough Road" hanging from the abandoned overpass. The abandoned interchange is at mile marker 5.70 on Route 24.

Major intersections

See also

References

External links

Transportation in Essex County, New Jersey